Cornelia "Corrie" Laddé (27 October 1915 – 18 September 1996) was a Dutch swimmer who competed in the 1932 Summer Olympics.

In the 1932 Olympics she won a silver medal in the 4 × 100 m freestyle relay event. She was also fourth in the semifinal of the 100 m freestyle event and did not advance.

She was born in Batavia, Dutch East Indies and died in Bad Ischl, Austria.

References

1915 births
1996 deaths
Dutch female freestyle swimmers
Olympic swimmers of the Netherlands
Swimmers at the 1932 Summer Olympics
Olympic silver medalists for the Netherlands
People from Batavia, Dutch East Indies
Medalists at the 1932 Summer Olympics
Olympic silver medalists in swimming
20th-century Dutch women